Johannes Christiaan "Chris" Lanooy (16 March 1881 – 24 January 1948) was a Dutch potter and designer, who worked as ceramist, painter, draftsman and sculptor, and he produced stained-glass art.

Life and work 
Lanooy was born in Sint-Annaland i 1881 as son of Cornelis Lanooij and Janna van 't Hof. Lanooy studied at the Royal Academy of Art, The Hague and was a student of the Roermond architect and artist Pierre Cuypers and Gouda painter and art teacher Jan Lugthart. As a ceramist, he was an autodidact.

He worked at ceramic factories in The Hague, Gouda en Purmerend, and at the Royal Leerdam Crystal glass factory in Leerdam. His work has been exhibited regularly at home and abroad. The Princessehof Ceramics Museum in Leeuwarden has more than a hundred works of Lanooy in the collection. In 2002 this museum dedicated a retrospective exhibition of his work. Twenty-five years earlier, in 1977, this museum also dedicated an exhibition to his work. This exhibition was opened by the then Minister of Culture, Recreation and Social work, Harry van Doorn.

Lanooy was married to Joanna Elisabeth Schuitemaker. He died in January 1948 at the age of 66 in the province of Gelderland in Epe. In September 2008, the renewed council hall of the town hall of Epe was renamed the Lanooy lounge, and contained a stained glass window of Lanooy.

Public collections
Among the public collections holding works by Chris Lanooy  are:
 Museum de Fundatie, Zwolle, Netherlands
 Kröller-Müller Museum, Netherlands

Gallery

See also 
 List of Dutch ceramists

References

Further reading 
Ebbinge, E. C. J. Lanooy, kunstpottenbakker, uitg. Eisma, Leeuwarden, 1977 (ter gelegenheid van een tentoonstelling van zijn werk in het Gemeentelijk Museum "Het Princessehof" te Leeuwarden
Kley-Blekxtoon, Annette van der Leerdam glas 1878–2003 : de glasfabriek Leerdam, 4e druk, uitg. ANTIEK Lochem, 2004  (eerder uitgegeven als Leerdam glas 1878–1998: de glasfabriek Leerdam, in 1999 en oorspronkelijk als Leerdam glas 1878–1930 opgenomen in de Tijdstroom antiekwijzers, uitg.  De Tijdstroom, Lochem, 1984)
Heijbroek, Willem  [et al.] Tussen twee vuren: Chris Lanooy, 1881–1948, uitg. Waanders, Zwolle, 2002

External links 

  lanooij.com
  Christiaan Johannes Lanooy 1881–1948, kunstpottenbakker, at biografischwoordenboekgelderland.nl. 
    Chris Lanooy at artwis.com, 11 March 2010.
 Works of Chris Lanoo at Keramiekmuseum Princessehof.

1881 births
1948 deaths
Dutch ceramists
People from Tholen
Royal Academy of Art, The Hague alumni
20th-century ceramists